El Potito, (born Antonio Vargas Cortés in Seville in 1976) is a Spanish flamenco and new flamenco singer. He has been hailed as a "young singer tipped to be following in the footsteps of El Camaron." Bernard Leblon said he has a "prodigious voice capable of hitting incredibly high notes, [and] was an overnight sensation in the world of flamenco."

From a child at the age of 10, he began acting, singing and flamenco dancing on the tourist boats on the Guadalquivir River. As a teenager, collaborated with acclaimed artists such as Paco de Lucía ("Zyryab"). By 1996 he had already released two albums with collaborations with Vicente Amigo and others. He has since performed in a large number of performances internationally, collaborating in performances of Joaquin Cortes and Sara Baras, and is a singer in the Tomatito group. Altogether he has released six albums, the last of which is Macandé.

Discography
Contributing artist
 The Rough Guide to Flamenco (1997, World Music Network)

References

Flamenco singers
1976 births
Living people
People from Seville
21st-century Spanish singers
21st-century Spanish male singers